A concentrate is a form of substance that has had the majority of its base component (in the case of a liquid: the solvent) removed. Typically, this will be the removal of water from a solution or suspension, such as the removal of water from fruit juice. One benefit of producing a concentrate is that of a reduction in weight and volume for transportation, as the concentrate can be reconstituted at the time of usage by the addition of the solvent.

Soft drink concentrates
The process of concentrating orange juice was patented in 1939.  It was originally developed to provide World War II troops with a reliable source of vitamin C. 

Most sodas and soft drinks are produced as highly concentrated syrups and later diluted with carbonated water directly before consumption or bottling. Such concentrated syrups are sometimes retailed to the end-consumer because of their relatively low price and considerable weight savings. Condensed milk is also produced for transport weight savings and resistance to spoilage.

Most juice and soda concentrates have a long shelf-life due to high sugar content and/or added preservatives.

References

Solutions
Chemical compounds